Katherine Chidley (fl. 1616–1653) was an English Puritan activist and controversialist. Initially involved in resistance to episcopal authority and in separatist activity in Shrewsbury and London, she emerged during the English Civil War as a powerful advocate of an Independent or Congregationalist polity. Under the Commonwealth of England and the Protectorate she was a leader of Leveller women, noted for her contribution to campaigns on behalf of John Lilburne.

Shrewsbury

Chidley's origins and background, even her own family name, are unknown. She first appears in Shrewsbury as the wife of Daniel Chidley. The Shrewsbury Burgess Roll lists him in 1621, under the name Chidloe, as a tailor and the son of William, a yeoman of Burlton, a village to the north of Shrewsbury. By this time he had two sons, Samuel and Daniel. Katherine may have been from Shrewsbury or the surrounding area, like Daniel, but it is impossible to be certain. The baptism of the first child, Samuel, described as the son of "Daniell Chedler" was recorded in the parish register of St Chad's Church, Shrewsbury on 13 April 1618: the spelling of the surname is very varied. Between 1618 and 1629, the register records the baptisms of eight Chidley children and the burial of one, Daniel, who died in infancy. The couple were so intent on having a son with his father's name that they named a further son Daniel, which throws into question their naming of the first son. Katharine Gillespie has suggested that the naming of Samuel may have implied a likening of Katherine Chidley to the Biblical Hannah, who in  dedicated her first child, Samuel, to God and refused the traditional purification ritual until the child was weaned. Moreover, the dedication of the Biblical Samuel is followed by a prophetic utterance from Hannah, the model for the Magnificat, that looks forward to an overturning of existing power relations. Katherine Chidley herself was not mentioned in the parish register entries until the baptism on 12 February 1626 of the second Daniel, who was recorded as "s. of Daniell & Katharn Chedley"

Following the birth of the second Daniel, and possibly at earlier births, Katherine Chidley refused to undergo the Churching of women, a service prescribed in the Book of Common Prayer. She was not alone in this: the ceremony was suspect to Puritans, even of the fairly moderate kind. Katherine, along with Judith Wright and five other women, was cited for refusing to be churched by the Peter Studley, the High Church incumbent of St Chad's, later in the year, during a canonical visitation under Thomas Morton, then Bishop of Coventry and Lichfield. Judith was the wife of George Wright, sometime bailiff of Shrewsbury, and the couple had son, Joshua, baptised on 25 April 1625: George Wright was one of the relatively small number accorded the title of Mr. in the register, showing that he was regarded as socially superior to artisans like Daniel Chidley. However, he was cited for allowing meetings to hear sermons and sing hymns in his home on Sunday evenings, and it is known that these were centred on Julines Herring, the town's public preacher, of whom the Wrights were key supporters. Studley deferred to Morton's judgement: "whether Action of gathering together may be termed a conventicle we refer to your honorable court to judge and determine." Katherine and her husband were also among twenty parishioners presented to the Consistory court for failure to attend church. This may suggest that they had already sought to form a conventicle or separatist group. However, William Rowley, another former bailiff, was cited with them, although he was certainly not a separatist but a leader of the Puritan faction on the corporation and a close supporter of the Presbyterian Herring.

Although Studley chose for tactical reasons to conflate them, there seem to have been two distinct Puritan oppositional groups at St Chad's. Herring himself considered the Chidleys separatists and his biographer, Samuel Clarke reports that: "When some seeds of separation were scattered in Salop (by Daniel Childey and his wife,) their growth was checked by his appearing against them." Herring's criticism of them is reported as:

The Chidleys were distinct from the moderate Presbyterian Puritans in social class as well as theology. However, they continued to have their children christened at St Chad's, which was contrary to the beliefs and practice of convinced separatists. The last baptism of a Chidley child at St Chad's was of John on 26 October 1629, and the register has a gap where Katherine's name should be. In order to find like-minded people, and possibly for economic reasons also, the Chidleys were forced to move. It seems that their radicalism was deepened by the experience of living in London and it is possible that it was only in London that they moved decisively to a separatist position.

London

The Chidley's are shown to have been active in London by 1630 by a manuscript in the collection of Benjamin Stinton, and used by the Baptist historian Thomas Crosby. This records Daniel Chidley helping John Dupper or Duppa and Thomas Dyer to form a separatist church in the capital. This group was a splinter from a church which was organised by Henry Jacob in Southwark before his departure for New England, and later pastored by John Lothropp. The new grouping distinguished itself by rejecting entirely communion or contact with Anglican churches – an issue brought to the fore when one member had his child baptised in his local parish church, exactly as the Chidleys had previously done. Katherine and Daniel Chidley seem to have been involved in this radical underground resistance to the established Church throughout the 1630s. David Brown, a founder member of the group, implies that they tore a surplice as a deliberate act of iconoclasm one St Luke's Day (18 October) at Greenwich. This was a particularly ungodly place in their eyes because a Catholic chapel had been installed there for Queen Henrietta Maria. Little is known of the group's activities and it is unclear whether such direct action was typical. However, the Chidleys made progress socially and financially after their move to London. Daniel became a freeman of the Worshipful Company of Haberdashers in 1632, and their eldest son, Samuel, was admitted as an apprentice in 1634.

Controversies with Presbyterians

The Justification of the Independant Churches

Katherine's own views were made public for the first time in October 1641, just less than a year into the Long Parliament, which was Charles I was forced to call because of his disastrous handling of the Scottish Presbyterians, culminating in the Bishops' Wars. Chidley's target was Reasons Against the Independent Government of Particular Congregations, an attack on the Congregational polity by the English Presbyterian controversialist Thomas Edwards. The issue was one of great political importance and events were moving generally in the direction Edwards favoured. In negotiations between the Parliament and the Scottish Covenanters, the Scots had gradually but relentlessly pressed the case for a Presbyterian reformation of the Church of England and had brought along four ministers specifically to combat the Independents: "to satisfy the minds of many in England who love the way of New England better than that of Presbyteries used in our Church." Parliament had temporised, committing only to a reformation of the Church "in due time as shall best conduce to the glory of God and the peace of the Church," but it was clear that there would be a need for serious concessions to the Scots if hostilities broke out between king and Parliament. Chidley's response to the situation was The Justification of the Independant Churches of Christ. Being an Answer to Mr. Edwards his Booke. Edwards had attacked the Independents both for separatism and for what he saw as their unstable and fissiparous structures. In particular, he had no confidence in the ability of ordinary people to judge the value of ministers:

Chidley asked for the reader's indulgence, as she knew she did not have the education and experience of the formidable Edwards:

She began her response by roundly declaring the lawfulness of separation:

She gave vent to considerable bitterness against the clergy of the Church of England, whom she called "those Locusts, which ascended out of the bottomlesse pit, ." Later in the book she listed the ways in which the Episcopalian clergy exploited the poor, including one which refers to the fee extracted for the churching of women, which she had boycotted in Shrewsbury.

However, separation, in her view, was an ecclesiological imperative, rather than a political expedient:

Edwards had drawn attention to the lack of ministers in the Independent churches and challenged the authority of those they had. Chidley unpicked the ambiguities in his own claim to authority:

Chidley was anti-clerical in tone. She renounced the whole idea of apostolic succession in favour of apostolic mission:

Chidley challenged any notion of social superiority or clerical status as a qualification for establishing and governing churches:

Government by elders was common ground between Presbyterians and Independents:

However, any superstructure beyond the immediate local level was another matter. Chidley expressed total distrust in any authority not specifically sanctioned by God:

Edwards had rejected Toleration as likely to lead to the rising of subordinate groups in society and to social collapse. Chidley, however, championed the people, including the poor:

Where Edwards thought that male householders would lose their authority over wives, children and servants, she argued:

A New-Yeares-Gift

Chidley's further contributions to controversy mirrored the developing political and military situation. The onset of the English Civil War forced the House of Commons of England on 6 September 1642 to pledge the abolition of episcopacy and unification with the Church of Scotland, although the practical working out of such a scheme was remitted to the Westminster Assembly of Divines. However, series of disasters for the Parliamentarians during 1643 forced acceptance of the Solemn League and Covenant, sworn by both Houses of Parliament on 22 September, committing England to a Presbyterian polity headed by the king. In the last months of 1644, with Parliament's situation increasingly secure, the Assembly of Divines brought forward proposals for the Presbyterian reorganisation, embodied in two reports or advices to Parliament: debate was scheduled for January 1645. Chidley recommenced hostilities with Edwards at this point by publishing A New-Yeares-Gift, or a Brief Exhortation to Mr. Thomas Edwards; that he may breake off his old sins, in the old yeare, and begin the New yeare, with new fruits of Love, first to God, and then to his Brethren. This sought to combat damaging claims he had made about the conduct of Independents in Antapologia, an attack on five dissenting members of the Westminster Assembly who were sympathetic to the Independents. Edwards had used smear tactics, seeking to conflate numerous disparate strands of dissent, all of which he claimed were proliferating under the noses of Parliamentarians.

Chidley observed that to answer Edwards was "a taske most befitting a woman." She sought to distinguish the Calvinist separatists from other, unrelated sects, including Anabaptists. Against Antinomianism she argued:

Against the Presbyterians, whom she saw as a new clerical élite, she affirmed the supremacy of the Church as a body over its ministry:

At the end of the pamphlet Chidley lambasted Edwards himself:

Chidley's counterblast to Edwards was probably published on 2 January 1645 and delighted Thomas Goodwin, one of the dissenting divines, who noted that Edwards was "baffled by the pen of a woman." On the crucial question of setting up elected presbyteries in churches, the Commons voted in the affirmative on 6 January and resolved to inform the Scots of the decision. However, it decided only "that many and several congregations may be under one Presbyterial Government," leaving the dispute between Independents and Presbyterians unresolved. Chidley was clearly very active in this period, as Robert Baillie, one of the Scottish representatives to the Westminster Assembly, deploring the appearance of female preachers, noted her at work:

Good Counsell, to the Petitioners for Presbyterian Government

By the autumn 1645 the focus of debate was London, where the ministers and authorities were involved in numerous wrangles and difficulties in establishing a Presbyterian system. During this period in November Chidley issued a single-sheet pamphlet under the title Good Counsell, to the Petitioners for Presbyterian Government, That they may declare their Faith before they build their Church.Chidley was particularly critical of the London ministers, whom she condemned for being interested only in

Countering the charge that Independency led to heresy, she pointed to equal likelihood of abuses by a powerful clergy:

Against this she set the checks implied in democratic control:

She ended by recommending the Presbyterians to return to apostolic ministry instead of tinkering with structures:

Despite widespread discontent among Independents, particularly in the Parliamentarian army, Parliament decided in June 1646 to press ahead with a Presbyterian reorganisation of the Church of England. This went ahead at varying rates in London, with only eight of the twelve classes represented at the first synod in May 1647.

Gangraena

Chidley was one of the separatists denounced by Edwards in his comprehensive denunciation Gangraena, published in three parts during 1646 and 1647, and addressed to Parliament as a "Catalogue, or Black Bill of the Errours, Heresies, Blasphemies and Practices of the Sectaries of this time, broached and 
acted within these four last years in England…" Chidley is featured only twice in a very long and rambling book but in one of these Edwards does refer pointedly to the title of his book: Julines Herring, who had died the previous year in Amsterdam, is credited with using the image of gangrene earlier in his references specifically to the Chidleys. Edwards portrays Chidley as bitterly sectarian, narrating an incident he claimed had taken place at Stepney Meeting House, where the moderate Independent William Greenhill was pastor.

Edwards went on to relate the activities of Chidley and her son Samuel in Bury St Edmunds: a passage in which he described her as "brasen-faced audacious old woman resembled unto Jael," apparently using a comparison she had herself put into circulation, although presumably with a different valuation.

Missionary activity

Katherine and Samuel Chidley were engaged in missionary work in Suffolk during 1647. Thomas Edwards testifies in the later part of Gangraena, compiled that year from readers' reports, that

The mission is known also from the extant covenant made by the church they helped found in Bury St Edmunds. The covenant is radically separatist:

The community swore "to become a peculiar Temple for the Holy Ghoste to dwell in, an entier spouse of Jesus Christ our Lord of glory."
Eight adults and six children subscribed, with Katherine and Samuel Chidley signing as witnesses, as compared with the seven converts estimated by Edwards.

The key member of the Bury congregation was John Lanseter, who became its first pastor and served until 1654, when he was expelled by his congregation for drunkenness. It seems that the Chidleys issued a pamphlet from Suffolk in response to the criticism of Katherine in the first part. Entitled Lanseter's Launce, Edwards mocked it:
"as for Laseter's lance for my Gangraena, I shall shew it to be made not of iron or steele but a lance of brown painted paper, fit for children to play with." Edwards alleged that the Chidleys worked together "one inditing, the other writing."

Edwards had made clear that the Chidleys' expedition to Suffolk was not unique, and it seems likely that they continued agitating and planting new separatist churches throughout a period of uncertainty. Presbyterian reorganisation was even more patchy in the rest of the country than in London and another ordinance was passed in January 1648, with the aim of removing obstructions to the process. It foundered mainly as a result of opposition from Independents in the increasingly powerful army. The irascible Edwards had been forced to leave the country during late summer 1647 and surfaced in the Dutch Republic as a member of the English Reformed Church, Amsterdam: he died there on 7 February 1648. The Second English Civil War, with the abortive invasion of the country by a Scottish army in support of the king, resulted in the final collapse of the attempt to construct a Presbyterian system and the triumph of toleration for the Independents. The Presbytrian structures fell into neglect after 1648, although the remaining active classes continued ordaining ministers throughout the Commonwealth and Protectorate periods.

Businesswoman

Daniel Chidley became a Master of the Haberdashers' Company in 1649 but died shortly after. Samuel Chidley became a Freeman of the company also in 1649. Katherine Chidley seems to have continued her husband's business, presumably with her son's help, and became a government contractor. This involved considerable sums. For supplying 4000 pairs of stockings to the army in Ireland she received £250 on 7 November 1651. On 7 January she was paid a further £104 3s. 4d. for 1000 pairs.

Leveller

By this time she had emerged as a leader of Leveller women and seems to have been involved in their petitioning of Parliament. On 29 April 1649 the English Council of State committed to prison the Leveller leaders John Lilburne, Richard Overton, William Walwyn and Thomas Prince, who owned a book critical of the regime, England's New Chains. The House of Commons agreed that they should be tried under Common Law on 11 April. The House was under a constant bombardment of petitions on behalf of the arrested Levellers, and women mobilised in numbers. On 23 April Bulstrode Whitelocke observed:

The women were driven off at pistol point, but returned the next day, although they "could not get it received." On 25 April they came to parliament for a third time, when:

This patronising answer seems to have provoked their Humble Petition of divers well-affected women of the Cities of London and Westminster, presented on 5 May 1649, which may have been written by Chidley. The Leveller women justified their political activity on the basis of "our creation in the image of God, and of an interest in Christ equal unto men, as also of a proportional share in the freedoms of this Commonwealth." They went on to ask:

However, he did know and had evidently examined, if not read, The Justification of the Independant Churches, as he describes the volume, although not its arguments. He also knew the report of the Stepney encounter with Greenhill, from the first part of Gangraena, but apparently not the narrative of the Suffolk mission, or anything of her Leveller connections, as he concludes: "Whether she wrote any thing more, or what became of her afterwards, I know not." She apparently merited no entry in the Dictionary of National Biography and only one mention: in the article on her adversary Thomas Edwards.

Socialist historians in the 20th century revived interest in the Levellers and the popular historian and journalist H. N. Brailsford mentioned both Katherine and Samuel Chidley several times in his book on the subject, written in the 1950s. Ian Gentles contributed an important article on the Chidleys to The Journal of Ecclesiastical History in 1978, going on the write the article on Katharine for the Oxford Dictionary of National Biography in 2004. By this time, she was becoming an important subject for Feminist historians. Katharine Gillespie of Miami University, who has sought to give serious weight to Biblical and theological perspectives, edited a facsimile edition of her writings, published in 2009. Interest is not confined to the Left: Chidley's centrality in discussion of the separation of Church and State has brought her to the attention of the Online Library of Liberty, sponsored by the Right Libertarian Liberty Fund, which is in the process of publishing her main works online. The Justification and A New-Yeares-Gift have been made available for free by the Text Creation Partnership in searchable and paginated online versions. As a result of the widespread interest, Chidley is now mentioned in general histories of the 17th century. A notable example, is episode 9 of Simon Schama's BBC History of Britain (at 12:30 minutes into the episode), and the supporting book, which gives consideration to Chidley and Leveller women more generally.

Footnotes

References

 
 
 
 
 
 
 
 
 
 
  
 
 

 
 
 
 
  
  
 
 

  (Temporary, uncorrected copy.)
 
  This was extracted from
  This contains an adaptation of the Women's Petition based on that in O'Faolainand Martines, above, and derives from Thomason Tracts, British Museum, 669, f. 14 (27).

Further reading
 

17th century in London
17th century in Shropshire
17th-century English businesspeople
17th-century English businesswomen
English separatists
English women activists
English women in politics
Levellers
Writers from Shrewsbury
Roundheads
Women in the English Civil War